"Creepin' Up Slowly" is the lead single and the third track from Australian rock band Taxiride's second album, Garage Mahal. This single was released on 10 June 2002. The song was recorded in Ocean Way Studios, Los Angeles, and produced by Jack Joseph Puig, as with all their previous singles. It was written by the group's Jason Mahendra Singh, Timothy Harcourt Watson and Timothy Andrew Wild, together with the American production and songwriting team Dow S Brain and Bradley K Young. It became Taxiride's second top-10 hit in Australia, reaching No. 6 on the ARIA Singles Chart, and also peaked at No. 19 on the New Zealand Singles Chart. In Australia, it was certified platinum for shipment of 70,000 units by the end of 2002.

Track listing
Australian CD single
 "Creepin' Up Slowly"
 "World's Away"
 "Happy"
 "Creepin' Up Slowly" (remix)

Charts

Weekly charts

Year-end charts

Certifications

References

2002 singles
Taxiride songs
2002 songs
Warner Records singles